Animation Domination (also called AniDom, Fox AD, and AD) is an American animated programming block which has aired in two iterations on the Fox broadcast network, featuring a lineup solely made up of prime-time animation and adult animation carried as a majority of, or the whole of, the network's Sunday evening schedule (outside of sports pre-emptions and early hour programming burn offs). It originally ran from May 1, 2005, until September 21, 2014, before returning on September 29, 2019.

History

Original run
Animation Domination debuted on Fox on May 1, 2005, in time for the last sweeps period of the 2004–05 television season. The first program to originate on the block was American Dad!, although its "pilot" aired as a Super Bowl lead-out program on February 6, 2005. Rounding out the Animation Domination lineup alongside American Dad! were The Simpsons (the longest-running cartoon on Fox and the network's first primetime animated series, which predated the lineup by 16 years), King of the Hill (which predated the lineup by eight years) and Family Guy (which predated the lineup by six years, and was revived as a series three years after its 2002 cancellation as a result of newfound popularity through reruns on Fox lineup and sales of the first, second, and third-season episodes on DVD). 

Until spring 2010, when Animation Domination only reprised of animated series, live-action programming would commonly occur within the block, including shows like Malcolm in the Middle and The War at Home. King of the Hill later ended on September 13, 2009 on Fox, and was replaced by the Family Guy  spin-off The Cleveland Show for the 2009–10 television season, with the former’s time slot of 8:30 PM. Four episodes of the series remained, but Fox opted not to air them, later being burn-offed in syndication from May 3–6, 2010. Fox would later premiere Bob's Burgers on January 9, 2011.

Beginning in the fall of 2014, the Animation Domination block was replaced by the Sunday Funday block, with the addition of live-action comedies Brooklyn Nine-Nine (which moved to Sunday night for its second season), freshman series Mulaney (which was canceled in early 2015), and, as of March 2015, the Will Forte sitcom, The Last Man on Earth. This marks the first time that the network has regularly aired live-action comedies on Sundays (outside of burn-offs of failed weeknight series) since 2005.

Return
The block returned on September 29, 2019, with previous AD series The Simpsons, Bob's Burgers, Family Guy, and the new series Bless the Harts. Duncanville debuted on February 16, 2020.

In April 2020, Fox Entertainment announced their partnership with Caffeine to produce the AniDom Beyond Show, a recap show hosted by Andy Richter. The show aired its finale on May 18, 2020 and it is unknown whether it will return in the future.

The Great North debuted on January 3, 2021.

On May 31, 2021, Animation Domination temporarily expanded into Mondays with Duncanville and the new series HouseBroken.

A new animated series, Grimsburg, will premiere in the 2022–23 season. Another new animated series, Krapopolis, was originally scheduled to premiere in the 2022–23 season, but was push back to the 2023–24 season.
On January 18, 2022, Fox announced they would be eyeing a two-hour Monday block in May 2023.

Bless the Harts ended after two seasons on June 20, 2021. A year later, on June 30, 2022, Fox cancelled  Duncanville after three seasons, and the series concluded on October 18, 2022 with its final six episodes on Hulu.

Universal Basic Guys/The Hoagie Bros. will premiere in 2024. The Simpsons, Family Guy and Bob's Burgers were each renewed for two more seasons through 2025 on January 26, 2023.

Programming

Current programming

Upcoming programming

Pilots

Bedrock

Former programming

Schedules

2004/05

2005/06

2006/07

2007/08

2008/09

2009/10

2010/11

2011/12

2012/13

2013/14

2019/20

2020/21

Sunday

 Monday

2021/22

Current lineup

Notes:
 The 7:00 p.m. hour is scheduled to be preempted every second, fourth and fifth Sunday from September 11, 2022, to January 8, 2023 (except December 25, 2022) due to the network's coverage of Fox NFL and The OT.

 The whole lineup was preempted on November 6, 2022, due to new episodes of The Masked Singer and Lego Masters.

 Family Guy was preempted on November 27, 2022, due to an episode of Welcome to Flatch at 8:00 p.m. In addition, The Simpsons aired at 8:30 p.m. and The Great North aired at 9:30 p.m.

 The Great North and Bob's Burgers were preempted on December 4, 2022, due to the first two episodes of HouseBroken season 2.

 Repeats of Bob's Burgers and Family Guy aired on January 1, 2023.

 The Simpsons and The Great North were preempted on January 8, 2023, due to the premiere of Alert: Missing Persons Unit.

 Family Guy will be preempted on March 19, 2023, due to two new back-to-back episodes of Bob’s Burgers.

Animation Domination High-Def

On January 8, 2013, Fox announced that it would launch an adult animation spin-off to its Sunday evening block called Animation Domination High-Def (ADHD). It originally broadcast on Saturday evenings for 90 minutes from 11:00 p.m. to 12:30 a.m. local time in most markets. It was later reduced to 11:00 p.m. to 12:00 a.m. on September 7, 2013, with the 12:00 a.m. half-hour being given back to its owned-and-operated stations and affiliates to carry other programming. Some of its affiliates delayed the block by 30 minutes to an hour to run late evening newscasts (sports overruns occasionally caused further delays).

The last edition of ADHD on Fox aired on March 5, 2016, with the new Lonely Island sketch comedy series Party Over Here to premiere in the slot on March 12.

See also
 List of programs broadcast by Fox
 Animation on Fox
 Fox Sunday Night
 20th Century Animation
 20th Television Animation
 Animation Throwdown: The Quest for Cards
 Night of the Hurricane – the first (and as of 2011, only) Animation Domination crossover event

References
Informational notes

External links
 

Television programming blocks in the United States
Fox Broadcasting Company
2005 introductions
Fox animation